Vasileios Polymeros (born 20 February 1976 in Volos) is a Greek rower. He won the bronze medal in men's lightweight double sculls with Nikolaos Skiathitis at the 2004 Summer Olympics in Athens, Greece and the silver in men's lightweight double sculls with Dimitrios Mougios at the 2008 Summer Olympics in Beijing, China.

References
sports-reference

1976 births
Living people
Greek male rowers
Olympic silver medalists for Greece
Olympic bronze medalists for Greece
Olympic rowers of Greece
Rowers at the 1996 Summer Olympics
Rowers at the 2000 Summer Olympics
Rowers at the 2004 Summer Olympics
Rowers at the 2008 Summer Olympics
Sportspeople from Volos
Olympic medalists in rowing
Medalists at the 2008 Summer Olympics
Medalists at the 2004 Summer Olympics
European champions for Greece
World Rowing Championships medalists for Greece
Mediterranean Games gold medalists for Greece
Competitors at the 2005 Mediterranean Games
Competitors at the 2009 Mediterranean Games
Mediterranean Games medalists in rowing
European Rowing Championships medalists